The following tables shows 2008 to 2019 passenger traffic statistics for all airports in the Republic of Ireland, ranked by total passenger traffic each year. The data also shows available total aircraft movements at each airport based on statistics published by the Irish Aviation Authority.

Dublin serves as the largest airport in Ireland, and in 2018 was the 13th busiest airport in Europe. Ireland has four main airports - Cork, Dublin, Shannon and Knock. There are also smaller regional airports at Donegal, Kerry, Galway, Sligo and Waterford. The latter three, as of July 2019, do not have any scheduled flights.

Many airlines serve Ireland with Aer Lingus, Aer Lingus Regional and Ryanair having a significant presence at Irish Airports. North America Airlines serving Ireland include Air Canada, American Airlines, Norwegian Air Shuttle, Delta Air Lines and United Airlines

Ireland is well connected with Europe mainly through Dublin, Shannon and Cork Airports. The United Kingdom is the most flown to country from Ireland. Transatlantic flights are available at Dublin Airport and Shannon Airports. US preclearance is available at both Dublin and Shannon Airport, two of fifteen US preclearance airports in the world.

At a glance

The graph shows the yearly total passenger numbers handled by Irish airports.

Table per year

2021 data

2020 data

2019 data

2018 data

2017 data

2016 data

2015 data

2014 data

2013 data

2012 data

2011 data

2010 data

2009 data

See also 

List of the busiest airports in Europe
Busiest airports in the United Kingdom by total passenger traffic
List of the busiest airports in the Nordic countries
List of the busiest airports in the Baltic states

References

Ireland, Republic Of